= Chamber of Furniture Industries of the Philippines =

Trade association in the Philippines

Logo of the Chamber of Furniture Industries of the Philippines

Chamber of Furniture Industries of the Philippines (CFIP) is a non-stock, non-profit trade association of furniture manufacturers, suppliers and service providers in the Philippines. The association was established in September 1966 and incorporated in 1967. It operates the annual Philippine International Furniture Show.
